Neope muirheadii, the black-spotted labyrinth, is a butterfly of the family Nymphalidae found in west and central China, Southeast Asia, and Taiwan.

Subspecies
Listed alphabetically:
N. m. bhima Marshall, 1881 – Burma (Shan States - Tenasserim)
N. m. lahittei Janet, 1894 – northern Indochina
N. m. felderi Leech, [1892]
N. m. nagasawae Matsumura, 1919 – Taiwan

References

Elymniini
Butterflies of Asia
Butterflies described in 1862